Trio Music Live in Europe is a live album by pianist Chick Corea with bassist Miroslav Vitous and drummer Roy Haynes recorded in  Switzerland and Germany in 1984 and released on the ECM label.

Reception 
The Allmusic review by Michael G. Nastos awarded the album 4 stars stating "Close to perfect, undeniably strong, willful, and musical beyond compare, Trio Music, Live in Europe belongs in your collection, and is simply as good as modern progressive mainstream jazz gets".

Track listing 
All compositions by Chick Corea except as indicated
 "The Loop" - 6:29   
 "I Hear A Rhapsody" (Jack Baker, George Fragos, Dick Gasparre)- 6:40   
 "Summer Night / Night And Day" (Al Dubin, Harry Warren / Cole Porter) - 14:23   
 "Prelude No. 2 / Mock Up" (Alexander Scriabin / Corea) - 12:19   
 "Transformation" (Miroslav Vitous) - 5:09
 "Hittin' It" (Roy Haynes) - 5:19   
 "Mirovisions" (Vitous) - 11:30   
@ Willisau & Reutlingen, Switzerland, September, 1984

Personnel 
 Chick Corea – piano
 Miroslav Vitous – bass
 Roy Haynes – drums

See also 
 Now He Sings, Now He Sobs (Solid State, 1968)
 Trio Music (ECM, 1982)

References 

ECM Records live albums
Chick Corea live albums
1986 live albums